City and Eastern Songs is the third album by anti-folk artist Jeffrey Lewis, though is credited to Jeffrey & Jack Lewis, Jeffrey's brother. Though Jack Lewis had contributed vocals, bass and songwriting to Jeffrey's two previous albums, this is the first instance in which he was given equal billing on the cover. The album was released in 2005 on Rough Trade Records and produced by Kramer.

Track listing 
 "Posters" 
 "Don't Be Upset" 
 "Williamsburg Will Oldham Horror" 
 "Something Good" 
 "The Singing Tree" 
 "Anxiety Attack" 
 "Time Machine" 
 "Moving" 
 "Art Land" 
 "New Old Friends" 
 "They Always Knew" 
 "Had It All"

References

External links
Jeffrey Lewis' Anxiety Attack video clip

2005 albums
Jeffrey Lewis albums
Rough Trade Records albums
Don Giovanni Records albums